The 1948–49 season was the 47th in the history of the Western Football League.

The champions for the first time in their history were Glastonbury, and the winners of Division Two were new club Chippenham United.

Division One
Division One remained at eighteen members with two clubs promoted to replace Radstock Town and Bristol Aeroplane Company, who were relegated to Division Two.

Salisbury, champions of Division Two
Weymouth, runners-up in Division Two
Bristol City and Bristol Rovers replaced their Reserve teams with their Colts.

Division Two
Division Two was increased from thirteen to eighteen clubs, after Salisbury and Weymouth were promoted to Division One, and B.A.C. Reserves, RAF Colerne and RAF Locking left the league. Five new clubs joined:

Barnstaple Town
Bristol Aeroplane Company, relegated from Division One.
Chippenham United
Radstock Town, relegated from Division One.
Weston-super-Mare

References

1948-49
4